Strange Academy is a fictional school appearing in American comic books published by Marvel Comics. It was founded by Doctor Strange to train young people from many worlds with magical abilities in the use of sorcery and magical artefacts. The school first appears in Strange Academy #1 (March 2020) and was created by writer Skottie Young and artist Humberto Ramos.

Publication history

Strange Academy began after Marvel writer and illustrator Skottie Young pitched the idea to fellow Marvel artist Humberto Ramos, who was intrigued by it. Young wanted to tell a "classic coming of age [story]… seen in so many other properties". Having just visited New Orleans, Young found the city the ideal setting for the folklore and magic of the series. In January 2022, it was announced that the first volume of the series would conclude with issue #18, with a new volume set to launch soon afterward. In July 2022, it was announced the series would resume as Strange Academy: Finals in October 2022, with Young and Ramos returning from the previous voulme.

Characters

Faculty

Adjunct Faculty

Students

Collected editions

References

Superhero comics
Marvel Comics titles
2020 in comics
2020 comics debuts
Doctor Strange titles